Dog's Heads is a 1955 Czech drama film directed by Martin Frič, based on the novel of the same name by Alois Jirásek. It was entered into the 1955 Cannes Film Festival.

Cast
 Vladimír Ráž - Jan Sladký-Kozina
 Jana Dítětová - Hancí
 Jarmila Kurandová - Mother
 Zdeněk Štěpánek
 František Kovařík - Krystof Hrubý
 Ladislav Pešek - Rehurek
 Jiřina Steimarová - Dorla
 Jaroslav Průcha - Pribek
 František Smolík - Pribek, senior
 Jana Stepánková - Manka
 Bohumil Svarc - Serlovský
 Jiří Dohnal - Adam Ecl Ctverák
 Jaroslav Vojta - Pajdár
 Miloš Nedbal - Lamminger z Abenreuthu
 Miloš Kopecký - Kos, správce

References

External links
 

1955 films
1950s historical drama films
1950s Czech-language films
Czechoslovak drama films
Czech historical drama films
Films directed by Martin Frič
Films based on Czech novels
Films based on works by Alois Jirásek
1955 drama films
1950s Czech films